The Victorian Railways used a variety of both 4-wheel and bogie open wagons for the transport of a wide range of loads.

History
Westinghouse brakes were added from 1891, with most vehicles modified by 1905. The addition of brakes, and the use of steel frames, meant that, by 1928, vehicles with  capacity had been developed.

Bogie vehicles were in a minority until their widespread introduction in the mid-1950s with the construction associated with Operation Phoenix.

Four-Wheel Wagons

I Series wagons
The first I wagon was built in 1859.
In 1902, the first  I wagons were built and got the nickname 'Tommy Bent' Wagon.
From 1907 to 1926, the standard I wagon was built which could also carry . These wagons had a longer wheelbase than the earlier 15-ton wagons.

I - Four-wheel Open Wagon

IA - Four-wheel Open Wagon
IA wagons were almost identical to the steel  I wagons. That allowed loads of up to  being charged at the 11-ton rate and loads from 11 to 15 tons at the 15-ton rate. The recoding started in early 1929 and continued while IB wagons were being scrapped.

IB - 11-ton Open Wagon

IC - Fixed-wheel Tippler Wagons
From 1954, approximately 350 I/IA wagons were converted for tippler traffic, to carry coal between Yallourn and Newport Power Station. Later tippler traffic was between the Maddingley Mine at Bacchus Marsh and the APM paper mill at Fairfield. The wagons were modified by removing the doors and replacing them with a steel plate welded into place.

ID - (ex D&MR Co) Open Wagon

IG / IX Fixed-wheel Open Wagon
Drop-sided wagon

IO - Fixed-wheel Open Wagon

IS & IT - Fixed-wheel Open Wagon

They were converted from other classes for timber traffic.

IY - Fixed-wheel Open Wagon

IZ - Fixed-wheel Open Wagon
In 1929, the first  wagon was produced.

G Series Wagons
In 1935, the VR started transporting bulk grain. To cater for that traffic, 200 standard I wagons were modified with grain-proof seals and were coded G.

In about 1956, due to the number of GY wagons, G wagons were no longer required for bulk grain and were reclassified to I or IA.

G - Bulk Grain Open Wagon

G - Fixed-wheel Open Wagon

GY - Fixed-wheel Open Wagon
In 1939, the VR produced the first of about 5000 wagons for carting bulk grain. Construction was carried out regularly from 1939 to 1958, with the majority being built in the late 1940s and early 1950s. The wagons could be seen in long rakes of up to 73. When not required for grain transport, the GY could be used for general goods service.

GZ - Bulk Grain Wagon
These were a grain-proofed version of the IZ wagon.

HY - Fixed-wheel Open Wagon
These were a general goods version of the GY wagon. As they were not designed for bulk grain so did not have the grain proof seals around the doors.

HZ - Fixed-wheel Open Wagon

Other Four-wheel Open Wagons

APM - Fixed-wheel Open Wagon

KF / KW - Fixed-wheel Motor Car Body Transport

RY - Fixed-wheel Open Wagon

Bogie wagons
Over time, four-wheeled wagons became obsolete. Bogie vehicles could run at higher speeds and, with more wheels, had a better axle-loading, meaning that they could carry a larger load. A number of classes of bogie vehicles were constructed.

E Series wagons
In 1925, the South Australian Railways placed a large order for rolling stock with the American Car and Foundry Company, USA. The Victorian Railways elected to tack on to that order two louvre vans, two flat cars and two open wagons, becoming 1 and 2 V, S and E respectively; the equivalents of the South Australian Railways M, Fb and O types, along with a class of 12 J-type hopper wagons.

E
As the tests in both states proved successful, the Victorian Railways constructed a further 200 E-type open wagons between 1927 and 1928.

From 1941, 100 randomly selected E-type wagons had their sides, doors and ends removed for conversion to S-type flat wagons. The vehicles retained their numbers except for wagon E1, which became S203 because the original S1 was still in service. Following World War II, 20 of those wagons were further converted to tank wagons. Another 14 were restored to open-wagon format before later being converted to tank wagons, while 38 were converted directly from open to tank with no intermediate flat-wagon stage.

In the late 1950s the riveted bodies of the E wagons were wearing out, so welded components similar to those used in the ELX program were used as required.

Some wagons were specifically allocated to State Electricity Commission traffic, running wooden power poles from the Brooklyn depot to various country depots. The wagons had their doors removed and bolsters fitted to the floors to make removal of the poles easier.

EF/EX
13 wagons were reclassed EF and fitted with roller bearing bogies and grade control equipment for use on the new standard gauge interstate line. The vehicles retained their E wagon numbers, but when made suitable for bogie exchange, they were recoded to EX and renumbered in the new series 1-13.

VOAA/VOAF
15 wagons made it to the 1979 recoding, becoming VOAA or VOAF, depending on the bogies fitted.

ELX Series wagons

ELF Wagon

ELX, VOBX, VOCX Wagons
The ELX is most easily distinguished from the similar E wagon by the fact that the ELX has four panels between its side doors, whereas the E wagon only has two.

ESX, VODX - Slab Steel
Twenty-six were built between 1964 and 1965, numbered 1 to 26.
Primarily designed for transporting sheet steel, they also saw use as general wagons due to the design being very similar to the ELX Wagon. In the late 1960s, they were used for transporting pipes for pipeline projects in Victoria.

OO wagons
The Victorian Railways' second foray into bogie open wagons, these six vehicles were very different from their R-type predecessors. The new wagons were massive, being billed as "the largest bogie vehicle '..in the British Empire..'."

The first unit entered service in 1899 as a trial of the new design, featuring plate frame sides and ends, two sets of double-doors per side, trap doors in the undercarriage and a  loading capacity - nearly twice the nearest competitor. Six-wheel plateframe bogies were fitted. The wagon was supposed to be used on locomotive coal traffic from South Gippsland to Melbourne, but could not be easily unloaded. Despite that, a further five units - OO2 through OO6 - entered service in 1902. Peter Vincent believes that all six had been built as a batch, but after the failure of the first vehicle the remainder were kept in storage until they could be made useful.

In addition to unloading problems, the wagons were difficult to manoeuvre around the yards of the coal mines in the South Gippsland region. At the turn of the century, the Korumburra, Jumbunna and Outtrim mines were producing over 4,000 tons of coal per week, equivalent to 45-65 wagon loads per day (excluding Sundays). Despite that, no single customer required  of coal in one delivery or had the facilities to manage that volume. At least three more of the OO trucks made it to the mines, but stayed empty in sidings because the managers "flatly refused" to load them. Eventually the Minister had to order the wagons back to Melbourne, empty, for storage.

In 1912, the vehicles found a new purpose, being fitted with extended sides and a new corrugated roof. They were then allocated to breakdown trains around the state  as mobile tool kits, to store much of the necessary equipment for re-railing of locomotives and other rolling stock. In that service, the wagons, now "vans", replaced older S-type breakdown vans which had initially entered service as boxcars in 1880. The vans kept their OO code until 1956, when they were re-classed HH.

QR, VOWA & VZWA - Drop Door Open Wagon

The design of the QR was effectively a compromise between the existing designs for medium-sized flat wagons (Q) and medium-sized open wagons (R). The ends were fixed, but the three drop-doors on each side could be removed if required.

The first vehicle entered service in March 1889, and was deemed successful. From July 1890 to May 1892, 150 wagons were constructed on behalf of the Victorian Railways by Wright & Edwards, at their Braybrook workshops, followed by QR152-201 in 1892, constructed by the Railways rather than being contracted out. The initial wagons were built with swing-motion, diamond-frame bogies. The underframe used both steel and wooden components, and was reinforced with truss rods.

The design was slightly altered in 1912 and 175 wagons entered service in five batches up to February 1924, when QR376 entered service. The vehicles were initially distinctive in their use of plate-frame bogies (otherwise used on heavier flat wagons, like the QB series), and were rated at  load.

The 1919 General Appendix indicated that only QR trucks with strengthened draw gear (no's 202-351) were permitted on express trains, and even then they had to be attached immediately behind the engine. Their use on any type of passenger trains required the explicit permission of the General Superintendent, and the Train Examiner was required to check the vehicle before its inclusion in such a consist.

A further 30 wagons, QR 377 to 406, were built in 1927 to an extended design, with four doors per side in lieu of three. The final member, QR407, was constructed in 1930, using leftover parts and matching the Type 2 design.

In the 1930s, the fitting of automatic couplers saw the underframes replaced. The new design was all-steel, reinforced with centre sills in lieu of the truss rods and heavier bracing on the ends, and the brake equipment on the first 201 wagons was upgraded from the previous combined brake cylinder and auxiliary reservoir to a larger brake cylinder and a separate auxiliary reservoir. When the buffers and truss rods were removed in the 1950s, the wagon capacity was boosted by a further ton.

The 1936 General Appendix specified that QR wagons 394 and 396 "have been specially prepared for the conveyance of theatrical scenery, &c., by Passenger trains. When no so utilised they are to be located at Port Melbourne for terminal traffic. A circular will be issues on each occasion that these trucks are used for the conveyance of special traffic."

In 1979, the class was recoded from QR to VOWA, translated respectively as Victorian, Open, Wood, and Low Speed. From 1983, some wagons were allocated to metropolitan-area work, and had 2000 added to their identifying number: i.e. VOWA356 became VOWA2356. In the mid 1980s, the wagons were generally removed from mainline service and transferred across to maintenance trains, being recoded to VZWA, with the "Z" indicating that change, and vehicles previously renumbered retained that change. Works wagons were also generally had a 30 cm-wide vertical green stripe applied to the right-most door, to help yard workers identify them.

R wagon (1880)
They were the first bogie open wagon used by the Victorian Railways, with 70 units constructed in 1880 by Harkness & Co., of Sandhurst, as part of a batch which also included 20 bogie boxvans of the S type. Both types of wagons featured a distinctive timber underframe design that was longer than the body, and were fitted with plate-frame bogies, although some later received bar-frame bogies.

They were rated to carry .

The vehicles had a very short working life, with many scrapped by 1899 and the remainder used in departmental traffic. R46 simply vanished in 1886, and R64 had its sides removed around the same time. Their last years in traffic saw the wagons modified and used as mobile coal stages for refuelling of steam locomotives.

Some, such as R6, were erroneously recorded as scrapped early, only to make reappearances decades later. Interestingly, for the most part the odd-numbered wagons were scrapped much earlier than the even-numbered wagons. Of the 31 units scrapped in 1891, only nine were even-numbered.

Many of the remaining wagons had coupler modifications applied around 1910. Some wagons were used in the Melbourne electrification project, including R4, R24, R47, R57 and R65, while others, such as R10, were utilised by the Way and Works department.

In 1903, R22 was scrapped, leaving only 11 vehicles in service. They all lasted another few decades until being scrapped in the period 1931-1937, excepting R47 and R10, scrapped in 1944 and 1945 respectively. Also in 1944, iced wagon TT45 was cut down and reclassed as the second R11, until being scrapped in 1958.

VKOX - Slab Steel Wagon

VOCY - Bogie Open Wagon

VOFX - Bogie Fertiliser Transport
Some recoded to BODX (Weekly notice 29/2014 pg15)

VOJX / VOJF - Bogie Open Wagon

Narrow Gauge Wagons

Just like the broad gauge railways, the  narrow gauge lines required open and flat wagons for general goods. Over two hundred were constructed between 1898 and 1914.

Liveries
In general, open wagons were painted in Victorian Railways Wagon Red livery. The grain-proofed wagons had a diagonal yellow stripe in opposite corners to readily identify them from non-grain-proofed wagons, and from 1970, the GY wagons were painted Hansa-Yellow.

Model Railways
Steam Era Models produce plastic kits of the GY wagon, the "Tommy Bent" I wagon, the standard I/IA wagon and IY wagon, and a slightly more difficult kit of the E bogie wagon.

Both Austrains and Powerline produce ready-to-run models of the ELX in various forms.

Austrains has released 3-packs containing flat-sided ELX 5-27-44 or 11-47-65, strengthened ELX numbers 67-96-101 or 72-97-105 and ESX open-sided 3-10-24 or 7-13-20. All wagons are in VR Wagon Red livery. The company has also indicated that they will produce a ribbed-sided ELX as well as the South Australian Railways and Australian National variations, and they are looking into producing the V/Line and further livery options. Th wagons do not come with Kadee Couplers fitted, but they use a high quality metal coupler that looks similar to the Kadee 58/158 coupler.

The wagons feature proper metal wheels in their bogies. Variations include the AN-liveried AOBX 527 and 533, SAR ELX 502 and 504, V/Line Brown VOCX 294-D and 451-E, VR Brown ELX 110, 259 and 379 and VR Brown VOCX 157-Y, 246-E and 339-H. However, all wagons of the same version (i.e. both SAR 502 and 504) have the same catalogue number, so customers will need to be specific if ordering by phone or email. Wagons with a Kadee Coupler have the letter A after the catalogue number, i.e. PD604A.

Railmotor Models has released a variety of polyurethane "loads" to fit inside the Powerline ELX wagon, including coal, ballast, and sleeper loads in various colours.

References

open wagons